Pyotr Mikhailovich Ustinov (born 8 February 1987) is a Russian former professional football player.

Club career
He played in the Russian Football National League for FC Sportakademklub Moscow in 2008.

External links
 
 

1987 births
Footballers from Dresden
Living people
Russian footballers
Association football goalkeepers
FC Torpedo Moscow players
Russian First League players
Russian Second League players
FC Sportakademklub Moscow players